Chiang Mu-tsai is a Taiwanese football manager and former player. When he was a player, he had played for Tatung F.C. In 1988, he was appointed Tatung's head coach. Since then he has played a key role in its success, leading the team to win the 2005 and 2006 seasons of Enterprise Football League (formerly named National Men's First Division Football League) and achieve semi-final in AFC President's Cup 2006. From 1994 to 2000, he also served as Chinese Taipei national football team's head coach.

Honours
Enterprise Football League: 2005, 2006
Intercity Football League: 2007
Best Coach (2007)

References

1953 births
Living people
Taiwanese footballers
Tatung F.C. players
Taiwanese football managers
Chinese Taipei national football team managers
Association footballers not categorized by position